11429 Demodokus  is a mid-sized Jupiter trojan from the Greek camp, approximately  in diameter. It was discovered during the Palomar–Leiden survey at the Palomar Observatory in 1960 and later named after the blind singer Demodocus from Greek mythology. The dark Jovian asteroid has a longer-than average rotation period of 50.2 hours.

Discovery 

Demodokus was discovered on 24 September 1960, by Dutch astronomer couple Ingrid and Cornelis van Houten at Leiden, on photographic plates taken by astronomer Tom Gehrels at the Palomar Observatory in California. The body's observation arc begins with its official discovery observation at Palomar.

Palomar–Leiden survey 

The survey designation "P-L" stands for "Palomar–Leiden", named after Palomar Observatory and Leiden Observatory, which collaborated on the fruitful Palomar–Leiden survey in the 1960s. Gehrels used Palomar's Samuel Oschin telescope (also known as the 48-inch Schmidt Telescope), and shipped the photographic plates to Ingrid and Cornelis van Houten at Leiden Observatory where astrometry was carried out. The trio are credited with the discovery of several thousand asteroids.

Naming 

This minor planet was named from Greek mythology after Demodocus, the blind singer at the court of King Alcinous, who is the ruler of the Phaiacians in Homer's Odyssey. The official naming citation was published by the Minor Planet Center on 24 January 2000.

Orbit and classification 

Demodokus is a dark Jupiter trojan in a 1:1 orbital resonance with Jupiter. It is located in the leading Greek camp at the Gas Giant's  Lagrangian point, 60° ahead on its orbit . It is also a non-family asteroid of the Jovian background population. It orbits the Sun at a distance of 5.1–5.4 AU once every 12.04 years (4,397 days; semi-major axis of 5.25 AU). Its orbit has an eccentricity of 0.03 and an inclination of 17° with respect to the ecliptic.

Physical characteristics 

Demodokus is an assumed C-type asteroid, while the majority of larger Jupiter trojans are D-types.

Rotation period 

In February 2014, a rotational lightcurve of Demodokus was obtained over five consecutive nights of photometric observations by Robert Stephens at the Center for Solar System Studies. Lightcurve analysis gave a longer-than average rotation period of  hours with a relatively low brightness amplitude of 0.18 magnitude.

Diameter and albedo 

According to the survey carried out by the NEOWISE mission of NASA's Wide-field Infrared Survey Explorer, Demodokus measures 37.63 kilometers in diameter and its surface has an albedo of 0.086, while the Collaborative Asteroid Lightcurve Link assumes a standard albedo for a carbonaceous asteroid of 0.057 and calculates a diameter of 46.3 kilometers based on an absolute magnitude of 10.4.

Notes

References

External links 
 Asteroid Lightcurve Database (LCDB), query form (info )
 Dictionary of Minor Planet Names, Google books
 Discovery Circumstances: Numbered Minor Planets (10001)-(15000) – Minor Planet Center
 Asteroid 11429 Demodokus at the Small Bodies Data Ferret
 
 

011429
Discoveries by Cornelis Johannes van Houten
Discoveries by Ingrid van Houten-Groeneveld
Discoveries by Tom Gehrels
4655
Named minor planets
19600924